Vigna luteola, commonly known as the hairy cowpea and the Nile bean, is a perennial vine found in many tropical areas.

Names
Vigna luteola is widely known in North America by the common names hairy cowpea or hairypod cowpea. This common name is derived from the Chickasaw waakimbala, which translates literally to "cow bean".

The vine also has a variety of other common names in South America and the Caribbean. In Cuba the plant is known as frijol cimarrón, Spanish for "wild bean", in Venezuela the plant is known as bajuco marullero, and in the Bahamas the plant is known as yellow vigna.

Description

Morphology
Vigna luteola is a hairy, short-lived perennial vine that occurs in moist soil and grows in either a spreading or climbing fashion. Its leaves are trifoliate, meaning they are a compound leaf of three leaflets. The leaflets are oval shaped and become acute at their apex. This creates bilateral symmetry in the flower. The pods are range from green to brown or black. The pods contain numerous large black seeds, and the pod twists spirally when the seeds are dispersed.

Phytochemistry
The flavonoids quercetin and isorhamnetin are found in the leaves, and are thought to help the plant resist aphids. The seeds resist storage pests due to their high levels of phytic acid, trypsin, and cystatin.

Taxonomy
Vigna luteola was first classified as Dolichos luteolus in 1771 by Nicholas von Jacquin, naming it from plants he cultivated in Vienna. In 1859, it was moved to the genus Vigna by George Bentham, classifying it as Vigna luteola. The name Luteola is derived from the Latin luteus, meaning "yellow", in reference to the plant's yellow flowers.

Habitat and ecology
Vigna luteola can be found in tropical areas on many continents. Formerly native to the New World, the plant was brought into cultivation in Ethiopia and is now spread around the world.

Vigna luteola grows in most commonly in coastal habitats on the Atlantic coast of the Americas, ranging from tropical regions of South and Central America to the Gulf Coast states, as far north as North Carolina. In Africa, the plant is most common to Zimbabwe, but ranges from Senegal to Ethiopia to Egypt, and can be found in the Middle East, in Australia, and is widespread across Asia.

It grows in swampy grasslands, on sandy lake shores, on stream sides, in wet pastures, in swamps, and in swamp forests. It prefers moist to wet clay soils, and will tolerate a wide range of salinities, from 0-10 ppt.

It is a larval host plant for cassius blue, grey hairstreak, long-tailed skipper and dorantes skipper butterflies, is often used as a source of browsing for white-tailed deer, and ground-feeding birds often consume the seeds.

Oomyces langloisii grows from dead stems of the plant in North America.

Uses
The flowers of Vigna luteola are eaten as a boiled vegetable in Ethiopia and Malawi, and the roots are chewed for the sweet juice. In Ethiopia the leaves and flowers are mixed with Hagenia abyssinica to treat ulcers and syphilis. In Argentina it is used to control cholesterol levels and is reported to have antimicrobial properties as well. It is also used to treat "ghost sickness", a supernatural ailment, in Polynesia.

Vigna luteola is most often considered a weed for crops due to its abundance. However, the plant is palatable for livestock and grows well in friable and slightly saline soils, meaning it is used as a pasture plant and as a ground cover in many countries, such as Ghana, Zambia, and Australia. However, its short lifespan and vulnerability to insects and frost can make it ineffective.

Gallery

References

luteola
Vines
Plants described in 1771